The Ministry of Revenues and Duties was a government ministry of Ukraine.

The ministry was created on 24 December 2012 by a Decree of Ukrainian President Viktor Yanukovych and it merged the country's State Tax Service and the State Customs Service. Its first and only minister was Oleksandr Klymenko. On 1 March 2014 the ministry was liquidated. Its agencies were transferred to the Ministry of Finance.

On May 27, 2014 it was announced that the ministry will be reorganized into the State Fiscal Service and will be subordinated to the Ministry of Finances.

Corruption case

Since 31 May 2014 Klymenko is wanted by the General Prosecutor of Ukraine for the creation of tax evasion procedures to significantly reducing the customs value of certain companies. An alleged example of this is the setting up of non-existing firms to whittle tax obligations. This and other alleged crimes are to have costed the state budget of Ukraine ₴6 billion. Klymenko has denied all allegations against him and has called them "groundless".

References

External links

 Ministry of Transportation and Communication (Archive) 

2012 establishments in Ukraine
2014 disestablishments in Ukraine
Revenues and Duties
Ministries established in 2012
Ministries disestablished in 2014
Ukraine
Ukraine
Government finances in Ukraine